GYN may refer to:
 Gyn, a lifting device on sailing ships
 Guyanese Creole
 Gynaecology
 Santa Genoveva Airport, serving Goiânia, Brazil